The 2013–14 Irish Cup was the 134th edition of the premier knock-out cup competition in Northern Irish football since its introduction in 1881. The competition began on 7 September 2013 with the first round and ended on 3 May 2014 with the final. The competition ran without a principal sponsor, but for the second successive season the final was known as the Marie Curie Irish Cup final, after the IFA once again awarded the naming rights for the final to the charity Marie Curie Cancer Care.

Glentoran were the defending champions, following their 3–1 win over Cliftonville after extra time in the 2012–13 final. However, they were eliminated in the quarter-finals by eventual winners Glenavon who defeated Ballymena United 2–1 in the final to lift the cup for the sixth time. As a result, Glenavon qualified for the 2014–15 UEFA Europa League first qualifying round.

Format and schedule
119 clubs entered this season's competition, the same number that had taken part the previous season. Originally there had been 122 entrants, but three clubs later withdrew from the competition before the first round matches had been played.

Regional league clubs from level 4 and below on the Northern Ireland football league system entered in the first round and played against other regional league clubs in the first three rounds. Nine clubs were given a bye into the second round this season, necessitated by the number of participants. One of the clubs to receive a bye later withdrew. 29 of the 30 NIFL Championship clubs entered the competition, with Donegal Celtic being the only absentee. The 29 Championship clubs entered in the fourth round, along with the 11 lower league clubs that made it through the first three rounds.

The 12 NIFL Premiership clubs entered in the fifth round, along with the 20 winners from the fourth round matches. Replays were only used if a tie was level after 90 minutes in the fifth round, sixth round and quarter-finals. If a tie in any of these three rounds was still level after 90 minutes of the replay, extra time was used to determine the winner, with a penalty shoot-out to follow if necessary.

† One match was not played (walkover)

Results

First round
The draw for the first round was made on 12 August 2013 with the matches played on 7 September 2013.

Ards Rangers, Albert Foundry, Ballywalter Recreation, Barn United, Dungiven Celtic, Oxford Sunnyside, Shorts and Strabane Athletic all received byes into the second round. Bangor Rangers, Holywood and Raceview were included in the original draw, but all three clubs withdrew before the first round matches were played. Bangor Rangers had received a bye, Holywood were drawn against Strabane Athletic, and Raceview were drawn against Ards Rangers. As a consequence, Ards Rangers and Strabane Athletic received byes, but Bangor Rangers' withdrawal meant that there would be an odd number of teams proceeding to the second round, necessitating a further bye at that stage.

|-
|colspan="3" style="background:#E8FFD8;"|7 September 2013

|}
Source: irishfa.com

Second round
The draw for the second round was made on 9 September 2013, with the matches played on 12 October 2013. The 35 winners from the first round matches entered this round, along with the 8 clubs that received a bye. As there was an odd number of clubs in this round, one club, 18th Newtownabbey Old Boys, received a bye into the third round.

|-
|colspan="3" style="background:#E8FFD8;"|12 October 2013

|}
Source: irishfa.com

†Immaculata won the tie by walkover. Camlough Rovers forfeited the match as they were unable to field a team to fulfil the fixture.

1Albert Foundry were ejected from the competition for fielding an ineligible player during this match.

Third round
The third round draw was made on 22 October 2013, with the games played on 9 November 2013. The 21 winners from the second round matches entered this round, along with 18th Newtownabbey Old Boys who had received a bye in the second round. Albert Foundry were replaced with Shankill United, the team they had defeated 1–0 in the second round, after they were found to have fielded an ineligible player in that game.

|-
|colspan="3" style="background:#E8FFD8;"|9 November 2013

|}
Source: irishfa.com

Fourth round
The fourth round draw was made on 11 November 2013, with the games played on 7 December 2013. The 11 winners from the third round matches entered this round, along with 29 of the 30 NIFL Championship clubs. Championship 1 side Donegal Celtic did not enter, which meant that there had to be eleven lower league clubs in this round to make up the requisite numbers, one more than the usual amount of ten.

|-
|colspan="3" style="background:#E8FFD8;"|7 December 2013

|}
Source: irishfa.com

Fifth round
The fifth round draw took place on 16 December 2013. The matches were played on 11 January 2014, and the replays were played on 21 January 2014. The 20 winners from the fourth round matches entered this round, along with the 12 NIFL Premiership clubs. Three regional league clubs made it through the first four rounds. This was the first round of the competition in which replays were used if a match ended level after 90 minutes.

Replays

Sixth round
The sixth round draw took place on 11 January 2014 after the fifth round matches were played, with the matches played on 8 February and 1 March 2014 and the replays played on 17 February and 1 March 2014. The 16 winners from the fifth round matches entered this round. Three clubs from tier three (Championship 2) made it into this round - the lowest ranked clubs that were left in the competition.

Replays

Quarter-finals
The quarter-final draw took place on 8 February 2014 after the sixth round matches had been played, with the matches scheduled for 1 and 10 March 2014. Championship 2 club Queen's University were the lowest ranked team left in the competition - the only representatives from the third tier.

Semi-finals
The semi-final draw took place on 1 March 2014 after the quarter-final matches had been played, with the matches played on 5 April 2014. Championship 2 club Queen's University reached the semi-finals for the first time in the club's history. They were the only semi-finalist from outside the top flight, and became the first club from outside the top two divisions to reach the semi-final stage since Killyleagh YC did so in 2001–02. For the first time since the 1996–97 competition, neither of the Big Two clubs – Glentoran or Linfield – reached the semi-final stage.

Final
Both finalists were making their first Irish Cup final appearance of the 21st century, Ballymena United having last played in the showpiece when they lifted the cup in 1989. Glenavon reached the final for the first time since finishing as runners-up in 1998. It was the fourth meeting between the two clubs in the final, and the first since 1981, when Ballymena United won 1–0. The final was played on 3 May 2014 at Windsor Park, Belfast.

References

External links
 Official site
 nifootball.co.uk

2013-14
Cup
2013–14 domestic association football cups